Jamuna Bank Limited  is a commercial bank in Bangladesh registered under the Companies Act 1994. It was established on June 3, 2001. Jamuna Bank had 167 branches as of March 2023 and 86 sub-branches . Its head office is located at Plot No. 14, Bir Uttam A. K. Khandaker Road, Block C, Gulshan-1, Dhaka, Bangladesh. Jamuna Bank Ltd is a 3rd generation private commercial bank,  was established by a group of local entrepreneurs. The bank, aside from conventional, also provides Islamic banking through designated branches. The Bank has real-time online banking branches (of both urban and rural areas) network to provide online banking.

CSR
Jamuna Bank donated 15 million taka to the Prime Minister Sheikh Hasina's relief fund for victims of election related violence in Bangladesh.

Award 
In recognition of Corporate Social Responsibility, Jamuna Bank Foundation and Jamuna Bank Executive Committee Chairman Nur Mohammed has recently received the prestigious Best CSR Bank 2021 award in The Annual Global Economics Awards 2021.3 

Al-Haj Nur Mohammed, chairman of Jamuna Bank and Jamuna Bank Foundation, has been awarded the 'Best CSR Personality' by Global Economics UK for his outstanding contributions towards corporate social responsibility (CSR) and for leading Jamuna Bank to be recognised as the 'Best CSR Bank'  again in 2022.

References

External links

 Jamuna Bank Foundation and Jamuna Bank has received the prestigious Best CSR Bank 2021 award
 Al-Haj Nur Mohammed, has been awarded the 'Best CSR Personality' and Jamuna Bank recognised as the 'Best CSR Bank'  again in 2022.* 

Banks of Bangladesh
Companies listed on the Dhaka Stock Exchange
Banks established in 2001